Dayville, Connecticut may refer to:

Dayville (CDP), Connecticut, a census-designated place
Dayville Historic District, a historic district within the CDP